Franjo Iveković (September 19, 1834 – March 2, 1914) was a Croatian linguist and religious writer, university professor and rector of the University of Zagreb.

Born in Klanjec, he studied theology in Zagreb and Pest, receiving his Ph.D. in theology in Vienna. For a brief period he served as a chaplain of the St. Mark's Church, Zagreb. At the Faculty of theology in Zagreb he taught Oriental languages and Biblical exegesis. Since 1875 he served as a docent, and since 1878 as a full professor at the Faculty of Theology. He was rector of the University of Zagreb in the academic year 1879/1880, and after his mandate expired he served as a prorector. He also served as the director of the Nobility Boarding School and a canon.

On the basis of the material collected by his deceased nephew Ivan Broz, and with his own research, he published an influential two-volume dictionary of Croatian in 1901. He published his papers in various journals and periodicals (Vienac, Rad, Književnik, Katolički list etc.).

Iveković died in Zagreb. Stairs on the Zagreb Gornji grad were named after him in 1931.

Works
 Životi svetaca i svetica božjih (1873-1888, 21892-1908)
 Biblijska povjest starozavjetne objave Božje za srednja učilišta (1879, 21895, 31900, 41907, 51913., 61918, 71921)
 Biblijska povijest novozavjetne objave Božje za srednja učilišta (1879, 21898, 31911)
 Rječnik hrvatskoga jezika. Svezak I. A - O. (1901)
 Rječnik hrvatskoga jezika. Svezak II. P - Ž. (1901)

References
 Iveković's biography at the University of Zagreb website

1834 births
1914 deaths
People from Klanjec
Academic staff of the University of Zagreb
Rectors of the University of Zagreb
Linguists from Croatia
Croatian lexicographers
Burials at Mirogoj Cemetery
University of Vienna alumni